Empress Maria can refer to several people:
 Maria (wife of Leo III) (died after 718), Byzantine Empress consort of Leo III the Isaurian 
 Maria of Alania (1053-1118), Byzantine empress by marriages to emperors Michael VII Doukas and Nikephoros III Botaneiates